An Evening with Ornette Coleman is a live album by Ornette Coleman. It was recorded in August 1965 at Fairfield Halls in Croydon, London, and was initially released by Polydor International in 1967. The album opens with a recording of a wind quintet by Coleman performed by London's Virtuoso Ensemble, followed by trio performances featuring Coleman on alto saxophone, violin, and trumpet, accompanied by bassist David Izenzon and drummer Charles Moffett.

The album was reissued by Freedom Records, a subsidiary of Black Lion Records, in 1972 with the title Ornette Coleman In Europe Volumes I & II, and was reissued again by Arista Records in 1975 as The Great London Concert. In 2008, the FreeFactory label reissued the album on CD under the name Croydon Concert.

Background
The concert that appears on the recording was presented as part of the Live New Departures series, and was organized by Victor Schonfield, Pete Brown, and Michael Horovitz. Prior to the event, the London Musicians' Union, which placed reciprocal quotas on foreign musicians, informed Coleman that the quota for jazz musicians was full, while the one for classical musicians was not. In response, Coleman quickly composed "Sounds and Forms for Wind Quintet," becoming the UK's first African American "concert artist." Izenzon and Moffett arrived from New York in order to participate in the remaining pieces.

The concert, which began with a poetry reading by Horovitz, accompanied by local musicians, was marked by a number of unusual occurrences. During the performance of Coleman's ten-movement wind quintet, the audience applauded after each movement rather than waiting until the end of the last movement, to the amusement of the musicians. In addition, during a silent moment in the trio's set, an audience member shouted "Now play Cherokee!", referring to the jazz standard. According to Horovitz, Coleman, in response, "instantly whizzed into an immaculately faithful version, whose lightning variations prompted the first of the evening's extensive series of standing ovations. He said later: 'I just wanted them to know I knew.'"

Reception

In a review for AllMusic, Brian Olewnick wrote: "this live concert captures Coleman in a transitional period that found him experimenting with contemporary classical forms as well as making more frequent use of the violin and trumpet. In many ways, it can be heard as an extension of the ideas first encountered on the ESP Town Hall Concert recording... there's an extremely refreshing freedom in his approach, one that strongly underlines his contention that innate musical ability trumps technique. An Evening with Ornette Coleman is a wonderful recording and should command a place in the collection of any serious fan of this great musician."

Writing for Elsewhere, Graham Reid called the album "a genuine gem and rarity," and commented: "The importance of this concert is in where it lies in Coleman's career. It is slap-bang between his classic and innovative playing with his groups which included Don Cherry, Charlie Haden, Billy Higgins, Ed Blackwell as well as this trio beforehand, and this group's classic At The Golden Circle live album just months later. As well it is pointing towards his major work Skies of America which he conceived at this time and recorded with the London Symphony Orchestra in '72."

Track listing
All compositions by Ornette Coleman.

 "Sounds and Forms for Wind Quintet - Movements 1-10" – 24:48
 "Sadness" – 3:33
 "Clergyman's Dream" – 12:15
 "Falling Stars" – 8:54
 "Silence" – 9:13
 "Happy Fool" – 7:11
 "Ballad" – 5:19
 "Doughnuts" – 6:10

Personnel 
 Ornette Coleman – saxophone, trumpet, violin (tracks 2–8)
 David Izenzon – bass (tracks 2–8)
 Charles Moffett – drums (tracks 2–8)
 Edward Walker – flute (track 1)
 Sidney Fell – clarinet (track 1)
 Derek Wickers – oboe (track 1)
 John Burden – English horn (track 1)
 Cecil James – bassoon (track 1)

References

1967 live albums
Ornette Coleman live albums